Bermont, Florida is a ghost town in Charlotte County, Florida, United States.

Bermont was at one time a sawmill town that was founded in the early 1900s. The town was also known for its sugarcane, which was made into sugar and juice. In 1908, it received a post office. It soon grew to have a general store and a school that was used as a church during the weekends. It also had a weekly newspaper, debating society, horticulture club and a literacy club. The town even had its own baseball team called Bermont Baseball Team that would often play the nearby town of Sparkman.

References

Geography of Charlotte County, Florida
Ghost towns in Florida